The Ministry of Finance of Denmark (Danish: Finansministeriet) is a ministry in the Government of Denmark. Among other things, it is in charge of the government budget (subject to approval by the Danish parliament, Folketinget), paying government employees and improving efficiency in government administration. The current Finance Minister of Denmark is Nicolai Wammen.

The Ministry of Finance was established on 24 November 1848. In 1968, the Ministry of Finance was split into the Ministry of Finance and the Ministry of State payroll and pension services. The latter was repealed on 11 October 1971, and the area was transferred to the newly created Budget Ministry, which from 1973 was again placed under the Ministry of Finance.

Organisation

Department (Ministry)

Agencies
 Agency for the Modernisation of Public Administration
 The Agency for Digitisation
 The Agency for Governmental Management
 Agency for Governmental IT Services

External links 
 Official website in English

Finance
Denmark
Government of Denmark
Denmark, Finance
1848 establishments in Denmark